Tibor Flórián (2 March 1919 – 28 January 1990), né Feldmann, was a Hungarian chess player and chess composer. He received the FIDE titles of International Master (IM) in 1950 and International Arbiter in 1951. Flórián was a Hungarian Chess Championship winner in 1945 and a European Team Chess Championship team bronze medal winner in 1961.

Biography
Flórián was leader of the Hungarian chess movement. He was General Secretary of the Hungarian Chess Union (1961-1984) and chief editor of the Hungarian chess journal Sakkélet (1983-1984). Tibor Flórián was chief arbiter of the 4th Women's Chess Olympiad (1969). He is also known as a chess writer who wrote several chess books. At the age of 15 he published his first chess problem.

In 1945, Flórián won Hungarian Chess Championship. Latest he repeatedly participated in national championships: 1951 - 8th, 1955 - 7th, 1958 - 4-5th, 1959 - 6-7th places.
Tibor Flórián was participant of many international chess tournaments where his best results: Belgrade (1948) - 1st-2nd; Bucharest (1949) - 4th-5th, 1951 - 3rd-4th; San Benedetto del Tronto (1957) - 3rd place.

He represented the national team of Hungary in the largest team chess tournaments:
 in Chess Olympiad participated in 1952;
 in European Team Chess Championship participated in 1961 and won a bronze medal in the team event.

Literature
 Florian, Tibor. Védekezés és ellentámadás, Budapest, 1965;
 Florian, Tibor. A legjobb Magyar támadójátszmák, Budapest, 1970;
 Florian, Tibor. The Schliemann Variation of the Ruy Lopez. Published by The Chess Player, Nottingham, UK (1970);
 Florian, Tibor. Defence and Counter-Attack. Published by Pergamon, Oxford 1983. ;
 Florian, Tibor. Entscheidung in der Schlussrunde. Ratschläge zur Vorbereitung - Beispiele zur Spieltaktik. Published by Franckh'sche Verlagshandlung, Stuttgart (1987). .

References

External links
 
 
 Tibor Flórián chess games at pdb.dieschwalbe.de

1919 births
1990 deaths
Sportspeople from Budapest
Hungarian chess players
Chess International Masters
Chess Olympiad competitors
Chess composers
Chess officials
Chess arbiters
20th-century chess players